A caïque (kaiki, from ) is a traditional fishing boat usually found among the waters of the Ionian or Aegean Sea, and also a light skiff used on the Bosporus. It is traditionally a small wooden trading vessel, brightly painted and rigged for sail. The caïque is also a typical case of positioning the widest beam far aft, with a long sharp bow.

Aegean fishing boat

Construction
Caïques are often built on the foreshore in a  shipyard, from pine wood.

The hull of the craft is built with sawn ribs and a timber keel, stem, etc.  covered with carvel planking, terminated with the deck.  The frame of the craft is often painted with orange primer, to preserve and seal the timber. The caïque usually has a short mast .

A bowsprit is stayed by rigging. In the stern of the caïque the predominant form is the tiller. These wooden steering arms are sometimes carved in the face of a dog or animal. The caïque often has a horizontal windlass mounted over the bow. The bow is also known in Greek as the proura or plowri, similar to the English prow.

Most caïques are painted white, to counter the powerful sun, with the strakes and topsides in vivid chromatic colors. The name of the boat is painted or carved on a tablet, on the planking below the bow.

Each caïque is unique. The majority are built from the boatbuilder's craft and memory having no plans. The bow post distinguishes the caïque from other Mediterranean working boats.

Modern-day use
Traditionally the caïque  was used for fishing and trawling. Of late they  have become a short excursion vessel, and former fishermen make money from the summer tourist trade on the busy islands, such as Corfu (Kerkyra) and Mykonos.

The art of the boatbuilder is dying as plastic and fiberglass craft supersede the wooden craft.

Bosporus light skiff

Caïque is also the term for a light skiff or long, narrow rowboat used especially on the Bosporus, Turkey.

It had a shape similar to that of a skate. Both ends of it were in such a form that it could be rowed in either direction with equal ease. The sides consisted of two long embellished boards. There were also lateral boards supporting the sides against water pressure.

There were also imperial caïques used by the Ottoman sultans and his suite for ceremonial and daily excursion purposes. The size and grandeur of this type, adorned with imperial armorials and floral scrolls, was a reflection of his royal power. Another feature of imperial caiques was the deck pavilion, a partition or a small kiosk for the Sultan. By reason of this feature they were also called the pavilion caïques.

Today, ordinary caïques are used mainly for local fishing purposes, and the current imperial caïques are modern reconstructions utilized for touristic purposes only.

Etymology
From the French caïque, from the Italian caicco, from the Turkish kayık (the source of the word loaned into the Greek kaiki and ultimately the English word as well), from the Ottoman Turkish qayïq or qayïk), related to the Persian qayeq but ultimately from the Old Turkic qayghug and qayghuq. It bears no connection to kayak.

The similarly-named Maltese kajjik is derived from the caïque.

Notes

References
 Gülersoy, Çelik. The Caique. Istanbul Library, 1991.
 Gautier, Théophile. Constantinople of To-day. David Bogue, 1854.
 Turkish Naval Museum. From Collections - Imperial Caiques. Retrieved on 2009-02-28.

External links

 Gatetoturkey.com - Imperial caiques on the Bosphorus
 Caïques of the Sultans - Photo gallery of Imperial caiques

Types of fishing vessels
Turkish words and phrases